The 2018 Korea Open was the seventh event of the 2018 ITTF World Tour. The event was organised by the Korea Table Tennis Association, under the authority of the International Table Tennis Federation (ITTF). It was the fourth of six top-tier Platinum events on the tour, and took place from 19–22 July in Daejeon, South Korea.

South Korea's Jang Woo-jin won the men's singles, men's doubles and mixed doubles titles, becoming the first player in the history of the ITTF World Tour to win three titles at the same event.

Men's singles

Seeds

Draw

Top half

Bottom half

Finals

Women's singles

Seeds

Draw

Top half

Bottom half

Finals

Men's doubles

Seeds

Draw

Women's doubles

Seeds

Draw

Mixed doubles

Seeds

Draw

References

External links

Tournament page on ITTF website

Korea Open
Korea Open
Table tennis competitions in South Korea
International sports competitions hosted by South Korea
Sport in Daejeon
Korea Open (table tennis)